Casper Heinrich Steinfort (December 21, 1814February 9, 1899) was a German American immigrant, farmer, and Wisconsin pioneer.  He was a member of the Wisconsin State Assembly during the 1873 session, representing northwest Jefferson County as a Liberal Republican.

Biography
Casper Steinfort was born on December 21, 1814, in the city of Dortmund in what is now western Germany.  Dortmund was then part of the Grand Duchy of Berg, but shortly after his birth it was absorbed into the Province of Westphalia, in the Kingdom of Prussia.  He was raised and educated in his native city and was employed as superintendent of a silk manufactory for several years there.

He emigrated to the United States in 1848, coming directly to the town of Waterloo, Wisconsin, in Jefferson County.  During the American Civil War, he served as a local recruiting officer for the Union Army.

He moved to the neighboring town of Lake Mills, Wisconsin, in 1867, where he was chairman of the town board for several years and served on the county board of supervisors.

He was elected to the Wisconsin State Assembly in 1872, running as a Liberal Republican.  This made him a member of the Reform Party—a short-lived coalition among Wisconsin Democrats, Liberal Republicans, and other reformers.  He served in the 26th Wisconsin Legislature and did not run for re-election in 1873.  In the Legislature, he served on the committee on state lands.

Personal life and family

Casper Steinfort married Henriette Oberstewilms when they were living in Prussia.  They had three children before emigrating to the United States, and had at least one more after locating in Wisconsin.

After his term in the Legislature, he moved to Watertown, Wisconsin, but returned to Lake Mills after the death of his wife in 1895.  He died at Lake Mills on February 9, 1899.

Electoral history

Wisconsin Assembly (1872)

| colspan="6" style="text-align:center;background-color: #e9e9e9;"| General Election, November 5, 1872

References 

1814 births
1899 deaths
Politicians from Dortmund
19th-century Prussian people
Prussian emigrants to the United States
Farmers from Wisconsin
Members of the Wisconsin State Assembly
People from Waterloo, Wisconsin
People from Jefferson County, Wisconsin
Wisconsin Liberal Republicans